Medial to the opening for the carotid canal and close to its posterior border, in front of the jugular fossa, is a triangular depression; at the apex of this is a small opening, the aquaeductus cochleae (or cochlear aqueduct, or aqueduct of cochlea), which lodges a tubular prolongation of the dura mater establishing a communication between the perilymphatic space and the subarachnoid space, and transmits a vein from the cochlea to join the internal jugular vein.

Additional images

References

Bones of the head and neck